My Story may refer to:

Literature

Fiction 
 My Story (Scholastic New Zealand), a series of historical novels for children
 My Story (Scholastic UK), a series of historical novels for children

Autobiographies 
 My Story (Clarke book), by Michael Clarke, 2016
 My Story (Couillard book), by Julie Couillard, 2008
 My Story (Das book), by Kamala Das, 1977
 My Story (Gillard book), by Julia Gillard, 2014
 My Story (Kray book), by Ronnie Kray, 1993
 My Story (Minogue book), by Dannii Minogue, 2010
 My Story, by Hall Caine, 1906
 My Story, by Tom L. Johnson, 1911
 My Story, by Sarah, Duchess of York, 1996
 My Story, by Schapelle Corby, 2006
 Ingrid Bergman: My Story, by Ingrid Bergman, 1980

Music

Albums 
 My Story (Ayumi Hamasaki album), 2004
 My Story (Iyanya album), 2009
 My Story (Jenny Berggren album), 2010
 My Story (EP), by Beast, 2010
 My Story, by Wicked Wisdom, 2004

Songs 
 "My Story" (R. Kelly song), 2013
 "My Story" (Puffy AmiYumi song), 2008
 "My Story", by Big Daddy Weave from Beautiful Offerings, 2015
 "My Story", by John Ashley, 1958
 "My Story", by Kero One, 2005
 "My Story", by Loren Gray, 2018

Film 
 My Story (film), a 2018 Indian film